The June 1946 Bavarian state election was held on 30 June 1946 to elect the members of the Bavarian Constituent Assembly. It was the first election held in Bavaria since 1932. The constituent assembly was tasked with drafting and passing a new constitution for the Bavarian state. After the passage of the constitution, the Constituent Assembly was dissolved and new elections called for December.

Background
Bavaria was completely occupied by American troops at the end of April 1945. General George S. Patton appointed Christian democrat Fritz Schäffer as interim Minister-President on 28 May 1945, before being dismissed by General Dwight D. Eisenhower on 28 September 1945 due to Schäffer's past anti-Semitic positions, and hiring of ex-Nazis within his administration.

The Ministry was then handed over to social democrat Wilhelm Hoegner, who oversaw the creation of a new Bavarian constitution in the spring and summer of 1946. To aid him, the Advisory State Committee was formed, with its members being appointed by the political parties or the state. The body was eventually dissolved, with direct elections being called for a Constituent State Assembly to oversee the passage of the Constitution. Thus, the first democratic elections were held in Bavaria since 1932.

Election result 

|-
! colspan="2" | Party
! Votes
! %
! Seats 
! Seats %
|-
| bgcolor=| 
| align=left | Christian Social Union (CSU)
| align=right| 1,587,595
| align=right| 58.3
| align=right| 109
| align=right| 60.6
|-
| bgcolor=| 
| align=left | Social Democratic Party (SPD)
| align=right| 786,045
| align=right| 28.8
| align=right| 51
| align=right| 28.3
|-
| bgcolor=| 
| align=left | Communist Party (KPD)
| align=right| 145,749
| align=right| 5.3
| align=right| 9
| align=right| 5
|-
| bgcolor= | 
| align=left | Economic Reconstruction Union (WAV)
| align=right| 137,765
| align=right| 5.1
| align=right| 8
| align=right| 4.4
|-
| bgcolor=| 
| align=left | Free Democratic Party (FDP)
| align=right| 68,417
| align=right| 2.5
| align=right| 3
| align=right| 1.7
|-
! align=right colspan=2| Total
! align=right| 3,048,337
! align=right| 100.0
! align=right| 180
! align=right| 
|-
! align=right colspan=2| Voter turnout
! align=right| 
! align=right| 72.1
! align=right| 
! align=right| 
|}

References

External links
 Historisches Lexikon Bayerns
 House of Bavarian Elections 

Bavaria
1946